Jocelyn Ann Burley (born 2 September 1942) is a New Zealand former cricketer who played primarily as a right-arm fast-medium bowler. She appeared in six Test matches and two One Day Internationals for New Zealand between 1966 and 1973. She played domestic cricket for Auckland, North Shore and Southern Transvaal. 

Burley's Test match best bowling came in 1966, when she took 7/41 against England.

References

External links
 
 

1942 births
Living people
Cricketers from Auckland
New Zealand women cricketers
New Zealand women Test cricketers
New Zealand women One Day International cricketers
Auckland Hearts cricketers
North Shore women cricketers
Central Gauteng women cricketers